Samuel Ato Amooah (born 7 January 1966) is a former member of the Sixth Parliament of the Fourth Republic of Ghana. He represented the Twifo Atti Morkwaa in the Central region of Ghana,

Personal life 
Amoah is married with four children. He is a Christian who fellowships at the Seventh Day Adventist.

Early life and education 
Amoah was born on 7 January 1966 in Twifo Nyinase in the Central region of Ghana.

He attended the University of Cape Coast and graduated with a bachelor's degree in Business Administration in 2009.

Politics 
Amoah is a member of National Democratic Congress (NDC). He contested in the 2012 Ghanaian elections under the ticket of NDC and won giving him the chance to represent the Twifo Atti Morkwaa constituency. He garnered 19,410 votes which represents 56.16% of the total valid votes and hence defeated the other contestants including Francis Owusu-Mensah, Ringo Gottah and   Seth Kwame Ofori. In 2016, he contested in the general elections and lost to Abraham Dwuma Odoom; as a result, he could not represent his constituency for the second time.

Employment 
Amoah was the Regional Monitoring and Evaluation Officer of National Health Insurance Authority in Ho.

References 

Living people
National Democratic Congress (Ghana) politicians
1966 births
University of Cape Coast alumni
Ghanaian MPs 2013–2017